The SPAD S.VII was the first of a series of highly successful biplane fighter aircraft produced by Société Pour L'Aviation et ses Dérivés (SPAD) during the First World War. Like its successors, the S.VII was renowned as a sturdy and rugged aircraft with good climbing and diving characteristics. It was also a stable gun platform, although pilots used to the more manoeuvrable Nieuport fighters found it heavy on the controls. It was flown by a number of the famous aces, such as France's Georges Guynemer, Italy's Francesco Baracca and Australia's Alexander Pentland.

Design and development

Origins
Performance in early aircraft designs was largely dependent on engines. In February 1915, Swiss designer Marc Birkigt had created an overhead cam aviation powerplant based on his Hispano-Suiza V8 automobile engine, resulting in a  engine capable of producing  at 1,400 rpm. Given the engine's potential, French officials ordered that production be set up as soon as possible and called upon aircraft designers to create a new high-performance fighter around the engine, called the Hispano-Suiza 8A.

Louis Béchereau, chief designer of the SPAD company, quickly produced drawings for a prototype fighter equipped with the new engine. The SPAD V was basically a smaller version of the SPAD S.A two-seat "pulpit fighter", although as a single seater it dispensed with the so-called "pulpit" which carried the observer in front of the propeller.

Design

One of many common design features between the new SPAD V and the S.A-2 was the use of a single-bay biplane wing with additional light struts mounted mid-bay at the point of junction of the flying and landing wires. This design simplified rigging and reduced flying wire vibration, reducing drag. The fuselage was of the standard construction for the time, consisting of a wooden frame covered with fabric, while the forward part was covered with metal sheeting. A .303 Vickers machine gun was installed above the engine, synchronized to fire through the propeller arc. The prototype was also fitted with a large spinner, to be abandoned later. Another common design feature of both the "pulpit fighters" and the S.VII - also shared with the S.XIII - was an all-pushrod aileron control linkage, which used a pair of exposed, 90º bellcranks protruding from the lower wing panels to operate vertical pushrods, going up to forward-projecting aileron control horns.

SPAD test pilot Bequet flew the SPAD V for the first time in April 1916. Flight testing revealed excellent maximum speed (192 km/h, 119 mph) and climb rate (4.5 min to 2,000 m or 6,500 ft). The airframe's sound construction also enabled remarkable diving performance. In comparison, the Nieuport sesquiplane fighters that equipped a large part of the fighter units could occasionally shed their lower wings in a steep power-on dive, a result of the single-spar lower wing design. The combination of high speed and good diving ability promised to give Allied pilots the initiative to engage or leave combat. If the new fighter was a rugged and stable shooting platform, some pilots regretted its lack of maneuverability, especially when compared to lighter types such as the Nieuport 17.

In the face of such performance, an initial production contract was made on 10 May 1916, calling for 268 machines, to be designated SPAD VII C.1 (C.1, from avion de chasse in French, indicating the aircraft was a fighter, while the 1 indicated it was a single seater).

Early production aircraft suffered from a number of defects which took some time to solve and limited the delivery rate to units. While a few SPADs arrived to frontline units as early as August 1916, large numbers only began to appear in the first months of 1917. In hot weather, the engine was prone to overheating. In cold weather, the engine would not warm up. Various field modifications were used to counter the problem, including cutting extra holes in the metal sheeting to provide more air flow over the engine. On the production lines, the cowling opening was first enlarged and eventually redesigned with vertical shutters to solve both problems. The engine mount also proved too weak and reinforcements were designed to counter that. Early production aircraft also had two ammunition drums: one for the loaded canvas cartridge belt, one to hold the empty belt after the rounds were stripped from it and fired (dealing with the loose fabric belt as it worked out of the gun was a significant problem on early fighter aircraft, until the disintegrating belt link was invented). This system was prone to jamming and was only solved when Prideaux disintegrating ammo links were introduced.

With the initial teething problems solved, several subcontractors began producing the SPAD VII under license in order to supply frontline units with the fighter. The subcontractors were the firms Grémont, Janoir, Kellner et Fils, de Marçay, Société d'Etudes Aéronautiques, Régy and Sommer. It was not, however, until February 1917 that the initial batch of 268 aircraft was delivered. In early 1917, an improved version of the engine developing 180 hp, the Hispano-Suiza 8Ab, was made available. This new powerplant provided the SPAD VII with even better performance, the top speed increasing from 192 km/h (119 mph) to 208 km/h (129 mph). The new engine gradually became the standard powerplant for the SPAD VII and by April 1917, all newly produced aircraft were equipped with it.

Variants and experiments
Numerous experiments were made with new equipment or engines in the hope of further improving the SPAD VII's performance. A Renault V8  powerplant was tested but required some major redesign and the resulting performance was not considered worthwhile. A supercharged Hispano-Suiza engine was also tested, and also failed to improve performance by any significant degree. Different wing profiles appear to have been tested but were not incorporated in production models. One field modification was applied in Czechoslovakia after the war when the undercarriage struts of one S.VII were faired over in an attempt to reduce drag to increase maximum speed.

Very early in the development of the S.VII, the British RFC and RNAS had shown an interest in the new fighter. An initial order for 30 aircraft was made but difficulties in early production were such that the delivery rate was very low, production being barely enough for French units alone. As the RFC was encountering an increasing opposition over the Front, measures were taken to set up production of the S.VII in the United Kingdom. Blériot & SPAD Aircraft Works and Mann, Egerton & Co. Ltd. were supplied with plans and sample aircraft and ordered to initiate production as soon as possible.

The first British-built S.VII was flown and tested in April 1917, and the first aircraft was reported to have performance equal to that of French models. There were however differences between the two types. The British were worried about the light armament of the S.VII: most German fighters were now carrying two guns and experiments were made to fit an extra machine gun on the S.VII. One aircraft was fitted with a Lewis machine gun on the top wing and tested at Martlesham Heath in May 1917, while front line units also made field modifications with Foster mounts as used on the S.E.5. The resulting drop in performance was considered too drastic for the installation to become standard, and most SPAD S.VIIs continued to fly with a single Vickers.

Other distinguishing features of the British-built S.VIIs included a gun fairing and a solid cowling access panel. The gun fairing partially covered the gun and extended rearwards, replacing the windshield. This, however, seriously limited pilot vision to the front and, although retained on training aircraft, it was ordered removed on aircraft destined for front line units in France. The bulged engine access panel located under the exhaust pipe on British models was made of a solid sheet of metal, in place of the louvered panel fitted on French production models. Some British SPADs were also fitted with small spinners on the prop hub.

It quickly became apparent that the British production lines of the S.VII had lower quality standards than their French counterparts, resulting in aircraft with degraded performances and handling. Poor fabric sewing, fragile tailskids and radiators of insufficient effectiveness plagued the British SPADs. Photographic evidence shows that a number of British SPADs had the cylinder banks fairings, or even the entire upper engine cowling, cut out to compensate for the ill-functioning radiators. Most British S.VIIs were used for training purposes, front line units being equipped with French-built models. After some 220 aircraft had been produced, British production of the S.VII was halted in favour of better British types that were becoming available.

In a similar fashion, Russia produced approximately 100 S.VIIs under license in 1917 at the Dux factory in Moscow, with engines supplied by France. It would appear the engines were often used and/or of lower quality, and that Dux used lower-grade material in building the airframes. This combination of extra weight and weaker powerplant resulted in aircraft with significantly reduced performance.

The total number of aircraft produced seems uncertain, sources varying from 3,825 to some 5,600 SPAD S.VIIs built in France, 220 in the United Kingdom and approximately 100 in Russia.

The SPAD XII began as a development of the S.VII, equipped with a 37 mm cannon. However, it underwent a major redesign and was a distinct type rather than a variant of the S.VII. the S.VII can be distinguished from both the S.XII and the later and larger S.XIII by having unraked cabane struts, connecting the top wing to the fuselage, as well as differences in armament.

Operational history

France

The French Aviation Militaire had been sufficiently impressed by the performance of the SPAD V prototype to order a batch of 268 aircraft on 10 May 1916. However, teething problems soon appeared and it would be several months before the SPAD VII would serve in significant numbers on the front, the last aircraft of the initial batch only being delivered in February 1917.

In spite of these delays, some aircraft were delivered to frontline units as early as August 1916, complementing the Nieuport fighters. By this date, the Nieuport 11 that had ended the infamous "Fokker scourge" episode had been largely replaced by later types such as the Nieuport 17 but these were now being bested by a new generation of German fighters by the second half of 1916 that threatened to give Germany mastery of the skies again. At the same time, the rotary engines that had powered most Allied fighters until then were proving difficult to scale further, while the heavier inline engines were steadily getting more powerful. In this context, it was hoped the new Hispano-Suiza 8-powered SPAD VII would be able to fight the latest German fighters on better terms. The first aircraft delivered to a frontline unit was S.112 flown by Lt Sauvage of N.65, followed by S.113, assigned to Georges Guynemer of N.3. Guynemer was already credited with 15 victories at the time, but it was Armand Pinsard of N.26 who was the first to score an aerial victory on 26 August.

The introduction of the SPAD VII was not enough to change the balance of the air war but it allowed both pilots and mechanics to familiarize themselves with the new fighter. Many pilots found the SPAD lacked maneuverability and some even returned to the nimbler Nieuports. New tactics based on speed were developed to take advantage of the SPAD's power, and to compensate for its lack of maneuverability. The aircraft's capacity to dive safely up to 400 km/h (249 mph) permitted the pilot to break from combat when the situation demanded it.

With early problems solved and production shared between several manufacturers, the SPAD VII was finally available in large numbers at the front in early 1917. By mid 1917, some 500 were in front-line service, having largely replaced the Nieuport. It gained a reputation for being stronger than its predecessors. Its principal shortcoming was its one machine gun armament at a time when the opposing Albatros D.III fighters were equipped with two.

The SPAD VII was gradually replaced by the improved SPAD XIII in front line units but remained in use as a trainer aircraft with Aviation Militaire throughout the war and it remained as the standard pilot certification test aircraft until 1928.

Foreign service

Allied air services were also equipped with the new fighter. The Royal Flying Corps was the first foreign service to receive the SPAD VII, although only two squadrons (19 and 23 Squadrons) used it on the Western Front. In addition, fighter schools in the United-Kingdom and 30 Squadron in Mesopotamia also received SPADs. British-built SPADs were generally used in the training units and in the Middle East, while fighting units in France used superior French-built models. The SPAD VII was replaced by the Sopwith Dolphin in 19 Squadron in January 1918 – with No. 23 Squadron in April (becoming perhaps the last squadron to use S.VIIs in France).

Russia received a batch of 43 in spring 1917 which were supplemented by approximately 100 SPAD VII manufactured by the Dux factory under license.

Another early user of the SPAD VII was Germany. Several were captured intact and were reportedly used both in combat and for training. Rudolph Windisch of Jasta 66 flew a SPAD VII in combat with German markings although it is not known if any aerial victories were achieved.

Belgium equipped the 5e Escadrille (later renamed 10e Escadrille) with the S.VII. Edmond Thieffry was probably the most famous Belgian pilot to fly the type, most other aces preferring the Hanriot HD.1.

Italy began using the SPAD VII in March 1917 where nine Squadriglia were equipped with it. As was the case in other air services, pilots accustomed to more maneuverable mounts disliked the new fighter, and again some reverted to the Nieuport 27 or the Hanriot HD.1, which eventually became the standard Italian Fighter. Francesco Baracca, Italy's leading ace, was delighted with the new model and his personal aircraft is preserved in Italy.

When the United States entered the war in 1917, an order for 189 SPAD VIIs was placed for the United States Army Air Service of the American Expeditionary Force. The first aircraft were delivered in December 1917. Most were used as advanced trainers to prepare the American pilots for the SPAD XIII.

After the war, surplus SPAD VIIs were used into the late 1920s by numerous countries, including Brazil, Czechoslovakia, Finland, Greece, Japan, the Netherlands, Peru, Poland, Portugal, Romania, Siam, the United States and Yugoslavia.

Operators

 
Argentine Air Force - Postwar - two aircraft.

Aviation Militaire Belge
5me Escadrille de Chasse
Groupe de Chasse
10me Escadrille de Chasse

Brazilian Air Force - Postwar - 15 aircraft.

Chilean Air Force (One aircraft)

Czech Air Force - Postwar - 70–80 aircraft

Estonian Air Force - Postwar, (Two aircraft)

Finnish Air Force - Postwar, (One aircraft)

Aéronautique Militaire
Lafayette Escadrille
Aéronautique Navale

Hellenic Air Force

 Corpo Aeronautico Militare (214 aircraft)
 Regia Aeronautica - Postwar

 (One aircraft)
 (Two aircraft)

Polish Air Force - (Post-war)

Portuguese Air Force

Romanian Air Corps

Imperial Russian Air Service - (43 aircraft)

Soviet Air Force - Postwar.
 (Thailand)
Royal Thai Air Force
 Ukrainian People's Republic
 Ukrainian People's Republic Air Fleet (two aircraft)
 (185 aircraft)
Royal Air Force
Royal Flying Corps
No. 17 Squadron RFC
No. 19 Squadron RFC
No. 23 Squadron RFC
No. 30 Squadron RFC
No. 63 Squadron RFC
No. 72 Squadron RFC
No. 92 Squadron RFC
 (Two aircraft - Fighter Squadron)

Aviation Section, U.S. Signal Corps
United States Army Air Service (189 aircraft)
93rd Aero Squadron
103rd Aero Squadron

Yugoslav Royal Air Force - Postwar

Surviving aircraft

Czech Republic
 11583 – SPAD VIIC.1 on static display at the Prague Aviation Museum in Kbely, Prague. It was flown post-World War I by the Czechoslovak Air Force and then the West Bohemia Aero Club until 1930.

France
 S.254 – SPAD VII Vieux Charles on static display at the Musée de l'Air et de l'Espace in Paris, Île-de-France. Georges Guynemer scored 16 kills in this aircraft in World War I.

Italy
 S.153 – SPAD VII on static display at the Italian Air Force Museum in Bracciano, Lazio. It was flown by Fulco Ruffo di Calabria.
 Unknown – SPAD VII on static display at the Italian Air Force Museum in Bracciano, Lazio. It was flown by Ernesto Cabruna.

United States
 B9913 – SPAD VII in storage at the Shannon Air Museum in Fredericksburg, Virginia. It was one of 100 British made SPADS built in 1917 by Mann Egerton & Co. Ltd. It was fully restored in 1973.
 B9916 – SPAD VIIC.1 on static display at the San Diego Air & Space Museum in San Diego, California. Built by Mann Egerton & Co. Ltd in Norwich, England in 1917, it was one of a batch shipped to the United States for use as a trainer. The aircraft was fully restored in 1990 and is 95 percent original.
 AS 94099 – SPAD VII on static display at the National Museum of the United States Air Force in Dayton, Ohio. It was acquired from the Museum of Science and Industry and restored by the 1st Fighter Wing from 1962 to 1966.

Specifications

See also

References

Notes

Bibliography
 Bordes, Gerard. "SPAD." Mach 1, L'encyclopédie de l'Aviation, Volume 8.  Paris: Atlas, 1981, pp. 2173–2187.
 Bruce, J.M. "The First Fighting SPADs". Air Enthusiast, Issue 15, April–July 1981, pp. 58–77. Bromley, Kent: Pilot Press. ISSN 0143-5450
 Bruce, J.M. SPAD Scouts SVII - SXIII (Aircam Aviation Series No. 9). England : Osprey Publications, 1969. .
 Connors, John F. Don Greer and Perry Manley. SPAD Fighters in Action (Aircraft in Action No. 93). Carrollton, Texas: Squadron-Signal, 1989. .
 Crosby, Francis. A Handbook of Fighter Aircraft. London: Hermes House, 2003. .
  
 Gerdessen, Frederik. "Estonian Air Power 1918 – 1945". Air Enthusiast, No. 18, April – July 1982. pp. 61–76. .
 Guttman, Jon. SPAD SVII Aces of World War 1 (Osprey Aircraft of the Aces; vol. 39). Oxford: Osprey, 2001. .

 Rimell, R. L., Spad 7.C1 (Windsock Datafile 8). Berkhamsted, UK : Albatros Productions, 1996. .
 Sharpe, Michael. Biplanes, Triplanes, and Seaplanes. London: Friedman/Fairfax Books, 2000. .
 United States Air Force Museum Guidebook. Wright-Patterson AFB, Ohio: Air Force Museum Foundation, 1975.
 Velek, Martin, Spad S.VII C1. Prague : MARK I, 2004. .

External links

Spad VIIs in the United States Air Service and Lafayette Flying Corps

1910s French fighter aircraft
Military aircraft of World War I
S.VII
Aircraft first flown in 1916
Biplanes
Single-engined tractor aircraft